USS Wildcat and its variant spelling, is a name used more than once by the United States Navy:

 ,  schooner purchased at Baltimore, Maryland, late in 1822.
 , a captured schooner that served in the American Civil War.
 , a freighter commissioned on 17 July 1917.
 , also known as IX-130, a  tanker, built for the United States Navy during World War II.

United States Navy ship names